This list of the prehistoric life of New York contains the various prehistoric life-forms whose fossilized remains have been reported from within the US state of New York.

Precambrian
The Paleobiology Database records no known occurrences of Precambrian fossils in Alabama.

Paleozoic

Selected Paleozoic taxa of New York

 †Acanthoclymenia
 †Acanthodus
 †Achatella
  †Acidiscus
 †Acimetopus
 †Acodus
 †Actinoceras
 †Actinophyllum
  †Acutiramus
 †Agoniatites
 †Agraulos
 †Allotrioceras
 †Amorphognathus
 †Amplexopora
 †Amplexus
 †Analox
 †Anchiopsis
 †Aneurophyton
 †Aphetoceras
 †Aphyllopteris
  †Archaeopteris
 †Archaeopteris halliana
 †Archaeopteris hibernica
 †Archaeopteris macilenta
 †Archaeopteris obtusa
 †Archaeopteris sphenophyllifolia
 †Arctinurus
 Argyrotheca
 †Asaphus
 †Athyris
 †Athyris spiriferoides
 †Atops
 †Atrypa
 †Atrypa reticularis
  †Attercopus
 †Attercopus fimbriunguis
 †Attercopus fimbriungus
 †Aulatornoceras
 †Aulopora
 †Aulopora microbuccinata
 †Aviculopecten
 †Bactrotheca – report made of unidentified related form or using admittedly obsolete nomenclature
 †Baltoceras
 †Barinophyton
 †Barrandeoceras
 †Bassleroceras
 †Bathydiscus
 †Bathyuriscus
  †Bellacartwrightia
 †Bellerophon
 †Bembexia
 †Benthamaspis
 † Bertiella
 †Bolbocephalus
 †Bolboparia
 †Bolboporites
 †Botsfordia
 †Bowmania
 †Brachyopterus
 †Buffalopterus
  †Bumastus
 †Bumastus ioxus
 †Bunaia
 †Callixylon
 †Callixylon erianum
 †Calymene
  †Calymene niagarensis
 †Calymenella
 †Calyptaulax
 †Camarotoechia
 †Camarotoechia billingsi
 †Camarotoechia litchfieldensis
 †Camarotoechia neglecta
 †Camarotoechia tethys
 †Cameroceras
 †Campbelloceras
 †Caninia
  †Carcinosoma
 †Cardiograptus
 †Carniodus
 †Carolinites
 †Cartersoceras
 †Cassinoceras
 †Centroceras
 †Ceramopora
 †Ceramopora imbricata
 †Ceratiocaris
 †Ceratocephala
 †Ceraurinella
  †Ceraurus
 †Chancelloria
 †Chasmatopora
 †Chazyoceras
 †Cheiloceras
 †Cheirurus
 †Chondrites
 †Chonetes
 †Chonetes ensicosta
 †Christiania
  †Cincinnetina
 †Cincinnetina multisecta
 †Cladochonus
 †Clarkeipterus
 †Clarkoceras
 †Climacograptus
 †Clitendoceras
 †Clorinda
 †Coenites
 †Columnaria
 †Conocardium
 †Conotheca
  †Cooksonia
 †Coolinia
 †Cordylodus
 †Cornulites
 †Cornulites flexuosus
 †Cornuproetus
 †Cotteroceras
 Crania
  Craniella
 †Craniops
 †Crassotornoceras
 †Crinoid
 †Ctenopterus
 †Curtoceras
 †Cybele
 †Cyclonema
  †Cyphaspis
 †Cypricardinia
 †Cypricardinia indenta
 †Cyrtobaltoceras
  †Cyrtoceras
 †Cyrtolites
 †Cyrtospirifer
 †Cyrtospirifer hornellensis
 †Cyrtospirifer whitneyi
 †Dadoxylon
 †Dakeoceras
 †Dalmanites
 †Dalmanites limulurus
 †Dalmanitina
 †Daonella
 †Decadocrinus
 †Deiphon
 †Dicoelosia
 †Dictyonema
  †Didymograptus
 †Dikelocephalus
 †Dimerocrinites
 †Dipleura
 †Diplograptus
 Discina
 †Discinella
 †Discosorus
 †Distomodus
 †Distomodus staurognathoides
  †Dolichopterus
 †Dracochela – type locality for genus
 †Dracochela deprehendor – type locality for species
 †Drepanophycus
 †Drepanophycus spinaeformis
 †Eatonia
 †Ecdyceras
 †Ectenolites
 †Edmondia – tentative report
 †Eldredgeops
 †Eldredgeops rana
 †Ellesmeroceras
 †Elliptocephala
 †Emmonsia
  †Encrinurus
  †Endoceras
 †Eoagnostus
 †Eoarthropleura – type locality for genus
 †Eodictyonella
 †Eospermatopteris
 †Eospirifer
 †Eospirifer radiatus
 †Eotripteroceras
 †Eremoceras
 †Erettopterus
 †Erieopterus
 †Erratencrinurus
 †Eucalyptocrinites
 †Eucalyptocrinites caelatus
 †Euomphalus
  †Eurypterus
 †Eurypterus dekayi
 †Eurypterus pittsfordensis
 †Eurypterus remipes
  †Favosites
 †Favosites biloculi
 †Favosites emmonsi
 †Favosites hisingeri
 †Favosites limitaris
 †Favosites niagarensis
 †Favosites turbinatus
 †Fenestella
 †Fletcheria
  †Flexicalymene
 †Flexicalymene senaria
 †Fordilla
 †Geisonoceras
 †Gilbertsocrinus
 †Glenisteroceras
 †Glyptocrinus
 †Goldringia
 †Gomphoceras
  †Goniatites
 †Gonioceras
 †Goniograptus
 †Greenops
 †Grinnellaspis
 †Gyroceras
  †Halkieria
 †Hallipterus
 †Halloceras
 †Hallopora
 †Hallopora elegantula
 †Halysites
 †Halysites catenularia
 †Hardieopterus
 †Helcionella
 †Heliomeroides
  †Heliophyllum
 †Heliophyllum halli
 †Hemiaspis
 †Hemirhodon
 †Hepaticites
 †Hercynella
 †Hertzina
 †Hexameroceras
 †Hibbertia
 †Hindia
 †Holopea
  †Homalonotus
 †Hostinella
 †Hughmilleria
 †Hungerfordia
 †Hyolithellus
 †Hyolithes
 †Hypodicranotus
 †Ibyka
 †Icriodus
  †Illaenus
  †Iocrinus
 †Isograptus
  †Isotelus
 †Isotelus gigas
 †Kawina
 †Kiaeropterus
 †Kionoceras
 †Kockelella
 †Lapworthella
 †Lawrenceoceras
 †Leclercqia
  †Lepidodendron
 †Leptochilodiscus
 †Leptospira
 †Levisoceras
 †Limuloides – tentative report
 †Linguatornoceras
 †Linguella
 †Lingula
 †Lingulella
 †Lonchocephalus
 †Lonchodomas
 †Luprisca incuba – type locality for species
 †Mackinnonia
  †Manticoceras
 †Marsupiocrinus
  †Matthevia
 †Mcqueenoceras
 †Meadowtownella
 †Medusagraptus
 †Meniscoceras
 †Meristella
 †Meristella barrisi
 †Meristina
 †Metabaltoceras – type locality for genus
 †Metaplasia
 †Michelia
 †Michelinoceras
 †Microcyclus
 †Micromitra
  †Mixopterus
 †Mixopterus multispinosus
 †Monograptus
 †Moorea
 †Morania
 †Mucrospirifer
 †Mucrospirifer mucronatus
 †Murchisonia
 †Nanahughmilleria
 †Nanno
  †Naticopsis
 †Niobe
 †Noeggerathia
 †Nowakia
 Nucula
 †Nuculoidea
 † Nyassa
 †Nybyoceras
 †Obolella
 †Obolus
 †Odontochile
  †Odontopleura
 †Olenellus
 †Olenoides
 †Oncoceras
 †Oonoceras
 †Ormoceras
 †Orthoceras
 †Oulodus
 †Ozarkodina
 †Ozarkodina confluens
 †Pachyphyllum
 †Paciphacops
 †Paedeumias
  †Palaeophonus
 †Palmatolepis
 †Palmatolepis triangularis
 †Panenka
 †Paracarcinosoma
 †Paraceraurus
 †Paradakeoceras
 †Parahughmilleria
 †Paraspirifer
 †Pelagiella
 †Pentagonia
  †Pentamerus
 †Periechocrinus
 †Periodon
 †Peronopsis
 †Phacops
 †Phacops cristata
 †Phoenixites
 †Phragmolites
  †Phyllograptus
 †Phylloporina
 †Pittsfordipterus
 †Plaesiomys
 †Platyceras
 †Platyceras carinatum
 †Platyceras rarispinum
 †Platystrophia
 †Plectoceras
 †Plectodonta
 †Pleurodictyum
  Pleurotomaria
 †Pojetaia
 †Pojetaia runnegari
 †Poleumita
  †Polygnathus
 †Proetus
 †Proscorpius – type locality for genus
 †Proterocameroceras
 †Pseudoniscus
 †Psilophyton
 †Pterospathodus
 †Pterospathodus amorphognathoides
 †Pterotheca
  †Pterygotus
 †Ptychagnostus
 †Ptychoparia
 †Pyronema
 †Quasillites
  †Receptaculites
 †Remopleurides
 †Rensselaeria
 †Reteocrinus
 †Rhinocarcinosoma
 †Rhynchonella
 †Ribeiria
 †Rimouskia
 †Rossodus
 †Ruedemannipterus
  †Rusophycus
 †Sawdonia
  †Scenella
 †Scenella montrealensis
 †Scenella pretensa
 †Schizo (genus)
 †Scutellum
 Serpula
 †Serrodiscus
 †Serrulacaulis
 †Sigillaria
 †Skenidioides
  †Slimonia
 †Solenopora
 †Solenopora compacta
 †Sowerbyella
 †Sphaerexochus
 †Sphaerocoryphe
 †Spirifer
 †Spirophyton
 †Spiroraphe
 Spirorbis
 †Spyroceras
 †Stigmatella
 †Strepsodiscus
  †Strophomena
 †Strophomena crassa
 †Strophomena incurvata
 †Strophomena pentagonia
 Stylaraea
 †Stylonema
 †Stylonurus
 †Subligaculum
 †Subulites
 †Suecoceras
 †Syringopora
 †Taeniocrada
 †Tarphyceras
  †Tentaculites
 †Tetradium
 †Tetraxylopteris
 †Tornoceras
  †Triarthrus
 †Triarthrus eatoni
 †Triendoceras
 †Trimerus
 †Trochoceras
 †Trocholites
 †Truyolsoceras
 †Tryblidium
 †Valcouroceras
 †Variabiloconus
 †Variabiloconus bassleri
 †Waeringopterus
 †Walcottoceras
 †Whitfieldia – tentative report
 †Wurmiella
 †Wurmiella excavata
  †Yochelcionella
 † Yorba
 †Zittelloceras
 †Zoophycos

Mesozoic
 †Apatopus
 †Apatopus lineatus
 †Atreipus – tentative report
 †Brachychirotherium – tentative report
 †Chirotherium
 †Chirotherium lulli
 †Chirotherium parvum
  †Grallator
 †Rhynchosauroides
 †Rhynchosauroides hyperbates – or unidentified comparable form

Cenozoic

  Acteocina
 †Acteocina canaliculata
 †Adeorbis
 †Adeorbis supranitidis
 Ammonia
 †Ammonia beccarii
 Anadara
 †Anadara ovalis
  †Anadara transversa
 Anomia
 †Anomia simplex
 Arctica
 †Arctica islandica
 Argopecten
  †Argopecten irradians
 Astarte
 †Astarte castanea
 †Astarte elliptica
 Astrangia
 †Astrangia danae
 Astyris
 †Astyris lunata
 Boonea
 †Boonea seminuda
  Busycotypus
 †Busycotypus canaliculatus
 Caecum
 †Caecum pulchellum
 †Canodona
 Caryocorbula
 †Caryocorbula caribaea
 Cerithiopsis
 †Cerithiopsis emersonii
 Chlamys
  †Chlamys islandica
  Crassostrea
 †Crassostrea virginica
 Crepidula
 †Crepidula convexa
 †Crepidula fornicata
 †Crepidula plana
 Cyclocardia
 †Cyclocardia borealis
 Cytheromorpha
 †Cytheromorpha macchesneyi
 Delphinapterus
  †Delphinapterus leucas
 Electra
 †Electra crustulenta
 Elphidium
 Ensis
 †Ensis directus
 Eontia
 †Eontia palmeri
  Epitonium
 †Epitonium rupicola
 Eupleura
 †Eupleura caudata
  Euspira
 †Euspira heros
 Gemma
 †Gemma gemma
 Hemimactra
 †Hemimactra solidissima
 Heterocyprideis
 †Heterocyprideis sorbyana
 Hiatella
  †Hiatella arctica
 Ilyanassa
 †Ilyanassa obsoleta
 †Ilyanassa trivittata
 Macoma
 †Macoma balthica
 †Macoma petalum
 Marshallora
 †Marshallora nigrocincta
  Melanella
 †Melanella jamaicensis
 Mercenaria
 †Mercenaria campechiensis
  †Mercenaria mercenaria
 Mesodesma
 †Mesodesma arctatum
 Mulinia
 †Mulinia lateralis
 †Mya
  †Mya arenaria
 Mytilus
 †Mytilus edulis
  Nassarius
 †Nassarius vibex
 Natica
 †Natica pusila
 Neptunea
 †Neptunea lyrata
 †Neptunea stonei
 Neverita
 †Neverita duplicatus
 Nucella
 †Nucella lapillus
  Nucula
 †Nucula proxima
 Odostomia
 †Odostomia bisuturalis
 Parasmittina
 †Parasmittina trispinosa
 Phoca
  †Phoca vitulina
 Pitar
 †Pitar morrhuanus
 Placopecten
 †Placopecten magellanicus
 Pusa
  †Pusa hispida
 Schizoporella
 †Schizoporella unicornis
 Seila
 †Seila adamsii
 Skenea
 †Skenea planorbis
  Tagelus
 †Tagelus plebeius
 Thracia
 †Thracia conradi
 Turbonilla
 †Turbonilla interrupta
 Urosalpinx
 †Urosalpinx cinerea
 Yoldia
 †Yoldia limatula

References
 

New York